Samsung Galaxy Prevail is an Android smartphone with 3.5 inch display, announced on April 5, 2011, for $180. It was the first Samsung Galaxy phone sold by Boost Mobile and is part of the Samsung Galaxy family, although it does not include Samsung's TouchWiz user interface. Its model number is SPH-M820. It was sold exclusively by Boost Mobile. It has 2MP camera, GPS, Bluetooth, WiFi and supports up to 32GB microSD memory cards. It is powered by a Qualcomm 800 MHz MSM7000 chip. It shipped with Android 2.2 Froyo.

The Galaxy Prevail measures 4.4x2.3x0.5 inches and weighs 3.8 ounces. Battery is a 3.7v Li-ion, 1500 mAh, model EB504465VA (Which is also compatible with the Samsung Acclaim SCH-R880, Samsung Craft SCH-R900, Samsung Indulge SCH-910, Samsung Intercept SPH-910, Samsung Replenish SPH-M580, Samsung Sidekick 4G SGH-T839 and Samsung Transform SPH-M920.)

On September 19, 2012, Boost Mobile and Samsung released an update to the Galaxy Prevail in the form of the Samsung Galaxy Rush.

Galaxy Prevail LTE

There is also an LTE version of the Prevail, with a 5 MP rear camera, 2 MP front camera, 1.2 GHz quad-core Qualcomm Snapdragon 410, 1 GB RAM, and 8 GB internal storage.

See also
 Galaxy Nexus

References 

Samsung smartphones
Android (operating system) devices
Samsung mobile phones
Samsung Galaxy
Mobile phones introduced in 2011